Arizona Christian University is a private Christian university in Glendale, Arizona.

History 
Founded in 1960 as Southwestern Conservative Baptist Bible College, Arizona Christian University's original campus was located at 2625 E. Cactus Road, in north-central Phoenix. Since its founding, the university has undergone a number of name changes, including Southwestern College, until its name was finally changed to Arizona Christian University in January 2011 in recognition of its growth from a small Bible college to a Christian liberal arts university.

ACU is accredited by the Higher Learning Commission, a commission of the North Central Association of Colleges and Schools. During the HLC's 2012 accreditation visit, ACU received its best report in the institution's history, including re-accreditation for the maximum ten years as well as approval to offer three new majors.
 
The university was initially founded to prepare students for careers in vocational ministry and missions, offering degrees in Biblical Studies and Christian Ministries. In 1972 the college first received accreditation with the Association for Biblical Higher Education (ABHE) and added regional accreditation through the Higher Learning Commission (HLC) in 1992.

ACU’s desire to serve the broader evangelical community was reflected in the decision in 2007 to become a non-denominational Christian college. In 2012, under the leadership of ACU President Len Munsil, the university received approval from the Higher Learning Commission (HLC) to offer degrees in biology, communication, and political science. Additional undergraduate degree programs are being planned. In March 2017, ACU received HLC approval to offer online degrees.

Len Munsil assumed the presidency of Arizona Christian University in 2010. Munsil is a constitutional attorney and leader in Christian non-profit and public policy work, and was the 2006 Republican nominee for governor of Arizona.

During Munsil’s tenure, ACU enrollment has grown from around 400 to more than 1,000 total students, and in 2021 achieved its seventh straight year of record enrollment.

In 2012, its commencement ceremony was broadcast nationally on C-SPAN and featured United States Senator Jon Kyl.

In November 2018, President Munsil announced that ACU was trading its 20-acre campus in north Phoenix to Arizona State University in exchange for the historic 68-acre campus in Glendale that was formerly the home of ASU’s Thunderbird School of Global Management. The new campus offers three times the classroom space, dorm rooms, parking, an enhanced student life experience with a historic Tower student union, Commons dining hall, a state-of-the-art library, an events center, and space for athletic facilities to be built so future Firestorm athletes can practice and compete on-campus.

The move to the new campus – which occurred during the summer of 2019 in time for classes in the fall of 2019 — enables ACU to continue to serve a growing student population while steadfastly maintaining its Christian identity, mission and purpose. In 2021, ACU acquired the former Glendale/Peoria YMCA adjacent to campus as a result of a major gift from Hobby Lobby founders David and Barbara Green and the Green family. It is now known as the Firestorm Recreation Center.

Notable graduates of Arizona Christian University include Dr. Mark Bailey, Chancellor and former President of Dallas Theological Seminary, who also began his teaching and academic administration career at then-Southwestern College. Former National Basketball Association All-Star and coach Paul Westphal began his coaching career at then-Southwestern College, leading the school to a Christian college championship.

Daniel Award
During the 2010–2011 academic year, the university celebrated its 50th anniversary and established the Daniel Award for Courageous Public Faith. The honor is given periodically to an individual who has courageously stood for his or her Christian faith and biblical truth in the public square.
 
The award is named for Daniel, the Old Testament prophet.

The first Daniel Award for Courageous Public Faith was presented to President George W. Bush on March 16, 2011, at a dinner celebrating ACU’s 50th anniversary at the Phoenix Convention Center. 1,260 guests were in attendance, and $1.5 million in scholarships was raised for ACU students. On February 9, 2012, the second Daniel Award was presented to the Rev. Franklin Graham, President and CEO of the Billy Graham Evangelistic Association as well as the international aid organization Samaritan’s Purse. The third Daniel Award was presented to Christian recording artist and three-time Grammy Award winner Michael W. Smith, who performed for ACU students, faculty and supporters in a concert at the Phoenix Convention Center on April 5, 2013. Subsequent Daniel Awards have been presented to Hobby Lobby founders David and Barbara Green and Focus on the Family founder Dr. James Dobson.

Other speakers on ACU's campus have included author Eric Metaxas, businessman Herman Cain, and politicians Gov. Rick Perry (R-TX), Sen. Ted Cruz (R-TX), Sen. Marco Rubio (R-FL), Arizona Gov. Doug Ducey (R), and Sen. Mike Lee (R-UT).

Cultural Research Center at Arizona Christian University
In March 2020, ACU established the Cultural Research Center at Arizona Christian University. It was formed in partnership with George Barna, a scholar of American culture and worldview, to produce credible research and analysis to show the transformational impact of the biblical worldview on American culture.

Athletics 
The Arizona Christian athletic teams are called the Firestorm. The university is a member of the National Association of Intercollegiate Athletics (NAIA), primarily competing in the Golden State Athletic Conference (GSAC) since the 2012–13 academic year; while its football team competes in the Sooner Athletic Conference (SAC); its men's wrestling team competes in the Cascade Collegiate Conference (CCC); and its men's & women's swimming teams compete in the Pacific Collegiate Swim and Dive Conference (PCSC). The Firestorm previously competed as an NAIA Independent within the Association of Independent Institutions (AII) from 2008–09 to 2011–12.

Arizona Christian competes in 22 intercollegiate varsity sports: Men's sports include baseball, basketball, cross country, football, golf, soccer, swimming, tennis, track & field, volleyball and wrestling; while women's sports include basketball, beach volleyball, cross country, golf, soccer, softball, stunt, swimming, tennis, track & field and volleyball. Club sports include badminton, band, bowling, cheerleading, dance, debate, lacrosse and shotgun sports. Former sports included acrotumbling.

Baseball
Since its inception in 2012, Firestorm Baseball has seen nine students taken in the Major League draft.

Football
In 2013, Arizona Christian University announced that it would be adding football in fall 2014, becoming one of four four-year universities in Arizona offering the sport. During the 2014 season, Firestorm Football had five games televised on Cox7. In 2015, ACU began competition in Central States Football League (CSFL). The Firestorm went undefeated in CSFL play en route to winning the conference championship. They finished the season 6-3 and ranked #22 in the NAIA. During the off-season, Head Coach Donnie Yantis took a job with Arizona State Sun Devils football. Assistant Head Coach Jeff Bowen was then promoted to head coach of the program. The 2016 season showed similar results with the team finishing undefeated in conference play and 7-3 overall, winning their second consecutive CSFL Championship. The team again finished the season ranked #22 in the nation. In 2018, the entire membership of the CSFL was transferred to the SAC for football. In the Spring of 2021, ACU went 9–2, won its first SAC Championship, and made its first appearance in the NAIA National Championship Playoffs.

Basketball
Patson Siame, who joined the basketball team in 2016, was part of the world select team at the 2012 Nike Hoop Summit. ACU basketball has been a perennial national contender and top-20 program since the arrival of Head Coach Jeff Rutter in 2012. Rutter is 198-81 and has led ACU to the NAIA postseason in seven of nine seasons. He was named NAIA National Coach of the Year in 2019.

Spiritual formation 
ACU is a non-denominational, evangelical Christian institution where applicants are required to have a personal relationship with Jesus Christ and agree to take part in ACU's spiritual formation activities, which include attending twice-weekly chapel services and taking 18 credit-hours of Bible. Upon application, students also acknowledge their agreement with the university's statement of faith.

References

External links
 
 Official athletics website

 
Educational institutions established in 1960
1960 establishments in Arizona
Education in Glendale, Arizona
Universities and colleges in Maricopa County, Arizona
Private universities and colleges in Arizona